Zack Polanski (born 1982) is the deputy leader of the Green Party of England and Wales, having served in the role since 7 September 2022. He has been a Londonwide member of the London Assembly (AM) for the party since May 2021. Polanski is also the national spokesperson for the Green Party for Democracy & Citizen Engagement.

Early life
Polanski was born David Paulden, but aged 18 decided to take back his family's original Jewish surname, which had been changed to Paulden in the early 20th century to evade antisemitism after they arrived in the UK from eastern Europe. Polanski has said it was important for him to find pride, not shame, in his identity. Polanski grew up in Salford to a Jewish family and attended Stockport Grammar School (on a financial scholarship) before leaving to go to a comprehensive college  He studied at Aberystwyth University before attending drama school in Georgia in the United States. He moved to London upon graduation. He is gay.

Career

Politics
Polanski was active in the Liberal Democrats. He stood in the Barnet and Camden constituency and was fifth on the London-wide list for the party in the 2016 London Assembly election. He then left the party and joined the Greens in 2017 after failing to be shortlisted as a parliamentary candidate in Richmond Park. He stood as the Green candidate in the Cities of London and Westminster parliamentary constituency at the 2019 general election and came in fourth. Prior to his election to the London Assembly, he became treasurer of the Jewish Greens.

On 6 May 2021, Polanski was elected a Member of the London Assembly, having been third on the Green Party's London-wide list. He also stood in the West Central constituency, where he came third, and for a Westminster Council by-election, where he came fourth, on the same day. In the new Assembly, Polanski was elected to be the chair of the Environment committee and to be on the committees for Fire, Resilience and Emergency Planning and the Economy Committee.

In December 2021, Polanski proposed a successful motion in the London Assembly backing the Climate and Ecological Emergency bill. It was a cross party motion with Labour and Liberal Democrat support.

On 6 June 2022, Polanski announced his candidacy in the 2022 Green Party of England and Wales deputy leadership election. On 7 September 2022, he was elected Deputy Leader, succeeding Amelia Womack.

Other ventures
Prior to being a politician, Polanski worked with the theatre company DifferencEngine as an immersive theatre actor, including appearances in The Hollow Hotel, The People's Revolt (in the Tower of London) and in the Peaky Blinders Immersive Theatre experience.

Polanski has also worked as a hypnotherapist. In 2013, he took a newspaper reporter for The Sun through a hypnotherapy session to increase her breast size at his Harley Street hypnotherapy clinic. He subsequently apologised for having done this, describing his own actions as misogynistic.

He taught at the Academy of Live and Recorded Arts and the National Centre for Circus Arts. Polanski also sang for the London International Gospel Choir.

Electoral history

References

1982 births
Living people
Alumni of Aberystwyth University
English Jews
Green Party Members of the London Assembly
Jewish British politicians
English LGBT politicians
Liberal Democrats (UK) politicians
People educated at Stockport Grammar School
People from Salford
Politicians from London